The Engineering Professors' Council is a British university association that represents university staff in UK engineering facilities, for discussing and coordinating course content and direction.

History
The Engineering Professors' Conference was set up in the early 1950s to allow an annual conference, held in London, where Engineering academic staff could meet. It was set up by Edmund Giffen (1 January 1902 - 2 July 1963), a Northern Irish professor of mechanical engineering from Gilford, County Down, and director of research from 1940 to 1945 for the Institution of Automobile Engineers, notably on diesel engines, which soon after became the Automotive branch of the IMechE.

The organisation was formed in January 1994 by the merger of the Engineering Professors' Conference and the Committee for Engineering in Polytechnics.

Function
It has worked with the Office for Students (OfS) and with the UK government (the Science and Technology Select Committee) on funding for engineering research at UK universities.

EPC Annual Congress
The society holds an annual two-day conference at different universities.
 25-27 March 2002, Durham University
 14-16 April 2003, University of Surrey
 4-6 April 2004, Cardiff University
 3–5 April 2006, Staffordshire University
 26–28 March 2007, University of Leeds
 1-2 April 2008, University of Warwick
 21-22 April 2009, Heriot-Watt University
 13–14 April 2010, Loughborough University
 12 April 2011, London South Bank University
 17–18 April 2012, University of Leicester
 16-17 April 2013, University of Portsmouth
 8–9 April 2014, University of Glasgow
 14–15 April 2015, University of Salford
 4-6 September 2016, University of Hull
 11-13 September 2017, Coventry University
 14-16 May 2018, Harper Adams University, Shropshire
 13-15 May 2019, UCL
 7–9 June 2022, UWE

Structure
It is headquartered in Surrey.

See also
 European Society for Engineering Education
 Council for Science and Technology, UK government advisory committee
 Royal Academy of Engineering

References

External links
 EPC

1994 establishments in the United Kingdom
Engineering education in the United Kingdom
Engineering university associations and consortia
Higher education organisations based in the United Kingdom